"Ta mig tillbaka" ("Take Me Back") is a song by Swedish singer Darin, released in March 2015 as the lead single from his seventh studio album Fjärilar i magen. The song was written by Darin, Ollie Olson and David Lindgren Zacharias and recorded at Atlantis Studio in Stockholm.

Background and release
On 9 March 2015 Darin shared a clip on his Instagram account announcing the release of his first self-written single in Swedish. In the clip, he writes "Ta mig tillbaka" on a sheet of paper, which was later revealed to be the single's title. On 10 March, Darin changed the cover photo of his Facebook page, revealing the release date of "Ta mig tillbaka", being scheduled for 13 March. The single, which tells the memories from Darin's childhood, was released in Sweden, Norway, Finland and Denmark and it was performed at the Norwegian-Swedish talk show Skavlan the same day.

Music video
The music video of the single was released on 4 May on Darin's YouTube channel. It was directed by James Velasquez and filmed in Stockholm on 16, 17 and 24 March. In an interview with Darin Worldwide, Darin said that he ''"wanted the video to be one with the lyrics and the music, so there's a magical but simple feeling to it, with old clips of me and things from the time when I grew up in the '90s".

Charts

Certifications

Release history

References

2015 songs
2015 singles
Darin (singer) songs
Songs written by Darin (singer)